The 2015–16 Top League was the 13th season of Japan's domestic rugby union competition, the Top League. It kicked off on 13 November 2015 and was completed on 24 January 2016. The final was won by Panasonic Wild Knights defeating Toshiba Brave Lupus by 27–26.

A short pre-season competition was also played from 3 September to 10 October 2015 to provide each Top League team with five official matches before the regular season.

Teams
The only change to the make-up of the league was the Challenge One winner Honda Heat replacing Kyuden Voltex.

Format
Owing to the 2015 Rugby World Cup and Japan's entry into the 2016 Super Rugby tournament, the 2015–16 Top League format was altered from the previous year.

Pre-season league
A pre-season competition was staged to provide each Top League team with five matches before the regular season.  In the first stage, played from 3–19 September, the 16 teams were placed into 4 pools of 4 teams each and a round-robin was played within each pool.

For the second stage, played from 3–10 October, the top teams in each pool were bracketed together to determine the pre-season competition winner. Semifinals and a consolation final and final were played to decide positions 1 to 4. The second-ranked teams in each pool played off for positions 5 to 8, the third-ranked teams played off for positions 9 to 12, and the bottom teams from each pool played off for positions 13 to 16.

Regular season
For the Pool stage, the 16 teams were placed into 2 pools of 8 teams each and a round-robin was played within each of the pools. At the conclusion of the pool stage, the top 4 sides in each pool advanced to the title play-offs to determine the Top League champion and the final classification positions 1 to 8. Similarly, the bottom 4 sides in each pool went on to the lower bracket play-offs to determine the final classification positions 9 to 16.

Preseason

Standings

Preseason play-offs

Fourth bracket

Third bracket

Second bracket

Notes:
 Panasonic forfeited their semifinal. NTT Docomo gained the walk over.
 Panasonic forfeited the 7th place final. Kintetsu gained the walk over.

First bracket

Regular season

Standings

Pool stage

Round 1

Round 2

Round 3

Round 4

Round 5

Round 6

Round 7

Lower bracket play-offs

Lower quarterfinals

Play-offs 9th–12th and 13th–16th

Classification finals

Title play-offs

Quarterfinals

Semifinals and play-offs 5th–8th

Classification finals

Final

All-Japan qualification
The 2016 All-Japan Rugby Football Championship took place as a one-off final match played between the respective winners of the Japanese Top League competition and the All-Japan University Rugby Championship. The match will be played at the Chichibunomiya Stadium in Tokyo on 31 January 2016. 

The abbreviated format was chosen due to the busy schedule for Japanese Rugby which included the 2015 Rugby World Cup as well as Asian qualification for the 2016 Olympics and the introduction of a Japanese Super Rugby team.

Top League Challenge Series

Kyuden Voltex, Mitsubishi Sagamihara DynaBoars, Munakata Sanix Blues and Osaka Police progressed to the promotion play-offs.

Promotion and relegation play-offs

End-of-season awards

Team of the season

References
 

Japan Rugby League One
Top League
Top League